Team Umizoomi is an American live-action and computer-animated musical children's television series with an emphasis on mathematical concepts, such as counting, sequences, shapes, patterns, measurements, and equalities. Neither imperial nor metric units are used in the show, meaning it can be shown in any location, regardless of which system is used locally.

In the United States, Team Umizoomi debuted on Nickelodeon on January 25, 2010. On February 20, 2014, it was confirmed that the series would not be renewed for a fifth season, and the live-action roles are not credited. However, reruns continue to air on the Nick Jr. channel and block.

A video game based on the series was released for the Nintendo DS on November 1, 2011.

Overview
Using the live actors and props with animated characters, vehicles and environments, the series follows the adventures of the titular Team Umizoomi, a trio of tiny superheroes who use mathematics to solve whatever problems occur in and around their home of Umi City.

Characters

Main
Milli (voiced by Sophia Fox in season 1 and Madeleine Rose Yen in seasons 2-4) - A 6-year-old girl who has abilities related to patterns and measuring. By singing certain phrases, she can use patterns to solve problems. She is Geo's older sister and is often the one to lead the team in many of their missions.
Geo (voiced by Ethan Kempner in seasons 1-3 and Juan Mirt in season 4) - An 8-year-old boy and Milli's younger brother. He mainly solves problems based around shapes, and has the ability to use them to make different kinds of objects, ranging from food, tools and clothing to animals, vehicles and buildings.
Bot (voiced by Donovan Patton) - A green robot who can extend his limbs to reach things, or use the screen on his belly (referred to as his "belly screen") to make calls and do math. He is Milli and Geo's primary caretaker, and as a robot features many retractable tools.
UmiCar (voiced by P.T. Walkley) - The team's anthropomorphic orange car who drives the team wherever their help is needed. The character primarily communicates via engine noises that sound like a cat purring through an electronic filter, though on rare occasions he can pronounce his own name with a clear and deep voice. UmiCar has been depicted as non-sentient in many early episodes, but has since become fully self-aware.

Recurring
Dump Truck - A living dump truck who doesn't speak real words and doesn't play fair.
The Shape Bandit (P.T. Walkley): A bandit cat who steals shapes.
Squiddy the Squid (Chris Phillips): A squid who creates all sorts of inventions.
The TroubleMakers (Little Trouble voiced by Nick Heatherington and Big Trouble voiced by Jason Harris): Two mischievous foes with the use of their TroubleRays stir up all sorts of trouble in Umi City and often sabotage Team Umizoomi in their tracks.
 TroubleTruck: The duo’s transportation unit.
 DoorMouse (Joe Narcisco (season 1-early season 2), Chris Phillips (late season 2-season 4). The security brown mouse who lives in Umi City, and he assists the Team to solve his riddles.
 SharkCar: Umicar's best friend

Episodes

Toys and merchandising
Fisher-Price released the first official "Team Umizoomi" toys in early 2012 and were made until 2015. The first products available included plush dolls, bath toys, and figurines featuring characters and vehicles from the show.

Preschool Math Kits
The first products released included a series of math kits designed to build preschool math skills. Each of the three kits included an episode of the show on DVD, a storybook, math activity book and math mission cards.
 Sorting, Classification & Reasoning Pre-K Math Kit (Playground Heroes)
 Shapes, Measurement & Positioning Pre-K Math Kit (Aquarium Fix-It)
 Numbers, Counting & Patterns Pre-K Math Kit (Carnival) (

Books

Little Golden Books
 Find the Dinosaurs!
 Purple Monkey Rescue!

Step Into Reading Books
 Outer-Space Chase
 Top Cops
 Dog Days
 Super Soap

Pictureback Books
 UmiCar's Big Race
 Santa's Little Helpers (Glow-in-the-Dark)
 Legend of the Blue Mermaid
 Save the Kitten!/Buster's Big Day (Deluxe Pictureback)
 Happy Love Day!

Board Books
 Follow that Egg!
 Count with Us!
 First Look and Find

Coloring and Activity Books
 Kite Riders! Coloring Book
 Painting Power! Painting Activity Book
 The Big Boat Race! Holographic Sticker Book
 Mighty Adventures Coloring Book with stickers
 Join the Team! Big Coloring Book
 Christmas Countdown Painting Activity Book
 Zoom to the Rescue! Painting Activity Book
 Umi Egg Hunt Activity Book with stickers

DVD releases
Paramount Home Media Distribution is the DVD distributor for the series.

Main releases

Episodes on Nick Jr. compilation DVDs

Video games

References

External links
 Team Umizoomi on Nick Jr.
 Team Umizoomi on the Internet Movie Database

2010 American television series debuts
2015 American television series endings
2010s American animated television series
2010s Nickelodeon original programming
American children's animated action television series
American children's animated adventure television series
American children's animated comic science fiction television series
American children's animated musical television series
American children's animated science fantasy television series
American computer-animated television series
American flash animated television series
American preschool education television series
American television series with live action and animation
Animated preschool education television series
2010s preschool education television series
Animated television series about children
Animated television series about siblings
Animated television series about robots
Animated television series about mice and rats
English-language television shows
Mathematics education television series
Nick Jr. original programming
Television series by Curious Pictures
Treehouse TV original programming